Deborah J. Glick (born December 24, 1950) is a member of the New York State Assembly representing the 66th Assembly District in Lower Manhattan, including the neighborhoods of Alphabet City, Greenwich Village, Noho,  the East Village, the West Village, Tribeca, and Battery Park City. She is a Democrat.

Biography 

Glick is a lifelong resident of New York City and has lived in Greenwich Village for over 40 years. A graduate of the City University of New York's Queens College, she received a Master of Business Administration degree from Fordham University. Glick owned and managed a small printing business in TriBeCa before becoming Deputy Director of General Services at the New York City Department of Housing, Preservation, and Development, where she worked until May 1990.

Glick's political activism began in college and she is still strongly involved in grassroots organizing. Glick first ran for the State Assembly in 1990 and won, becoming the first openly gay state legislator in New York State She has served in the legislature for 30 years, championing a number of progressive legislative causes as well as key local issues. She is Jewish.

Legislative record 

Glick serves as the Chair of the Assembly's Higher Education Committee, which oversees all private and public higher education institutions, financial assistance for students, and professional licensing, a position she has held since 2007. Additionally, Glick serves on the Ways and Means, Rules, Governmental Operations and Environmental Conservation Committees. She also serves as the Chair of the Assembly's Intern Program, overseeing the Assembly's student interns.

As an Assembly member, her legislative priorities have focused on women's rights, including expanding access to reproductive healthcare; LGBTQ rights; environmental preservation and protection; the protection of animals, especially those in shelters; higher education; tenants’ rights; increasing pedestrian and traffic safety; maintaining and expanding open space; and support for the arts.

LGBTQ and women's rights 

Glick's legislative victories include the passage of the Sexual Orientation Non-Discrimination Act (SONDA), which was finally signed into law in December 2002. Glick's Hospital Visitation Bill became law in 2004, providing domestic partners the same rights that spouses and next-of-kin have when caring for a loved one in a hospital or nursing facility.

She has worked on issues of concern to women for over thirty years, including advocating for reproductive freedom, a change in the rape statutes, and women's health concerns. The Women's Health and Wellness Act, a bill that promotes early detection and prevention of certain medical conditions affecting women, including breast cancer and osteoporosis and provides coverage for contraceptives, became law on January 1, 2003. Glick was the lead sponsor of the Reproductive Health Act, to codify and expand protections granted in Roe vs. Wade in New York State, which was signed into law in January 2019.

Deborah Glick supported the legalization of gestational surrogacy in the State of New York with some minor adjustments and changes to the bill to protect the surrogate and the parties involved in regards to monetary compensation.
The bill was first introduced in the New York State Assembly in 2012 by Amy Paulin. Governor Andrew Cuomo signed it into law in 2021, effectively repealing the ban on the medical procedure with monetary compensation for the pregnant women involved. Glick believes in family planning methods and stated on Twitter in October 2021 that there is a problem called overpopulation of people on the planet causing damage to the Earth.

Protection of animals 

Glick is an animal lover and has sponsored and helped pass a number of bills to improve animal welfare. These include the Veterinary Emergency Response and Mobility Act, which allows out-of-state veterinarians and veterinary technicians to provide assistance in New York during declared disasters and high-volume animal cruelty investigations, an act to prohibit the importation, possession, sale, or release of Eurasian boars in New York State, and a law prohibiting the online shooting of animals or targets. She has also fought for increased funding for animal shelters, and was twice successful in allocating a $5 million capital matching grant to humane societies across the state.

Higher education 

In her role as Chair of the Higher Education committee, Glick has championed the SUNY and CUNY systems and the rights of students. Among her legislative achievements, Glick was the primary sponsor of the Student Lending Accountability, Transparency and Enforcement Act, which established protections for students and parents to protect them from exploitative student loans and became law in 2007. She also sponsored and championed legislation to implement the Enough is Enough Program, which requires New York State higher education institutions to adopt a state-wide uniform definition of affirmative consent and a number of policies protecting the rights of sexual assault victims and those who report assaults. Glick has also been an ardent supporter of the rights of student workers, such as graduate teaching and research assistants, to collectively bargain through establishing union chapters.

Tenant's rights and arts support 

During her tenure, Glick has been a strong advocate for tenants’ rights and has sponsored and won renewal of the Loft Law. This law brings formerly commercial buildings up to residential code and protects current tenants, many of them artists, from eviction. This law became permanent in 2010. Deborah has always been a strong proponent of the arts and has consistently advocated for increases in funding state-wide because of her conviction that the arts play a crucial role in the economic and cultural life of New York City and New York State. Currently, she is the sponsor of several measures to protect the rights of tenants, as well as legislation to provide a tax credit to renters.

Pedestrian and traffic safety 

Glick has been a champion for pedestrian safety. She was the lead Assembly sponsor of a bill establishing a pilot program to install speed cameras in schools zones in 2013, which studies show has demonstrably reduced dangerous driving in those zones. Glick has championed legislation to expand that program, which has been blocked by the New York State Senate; however, after the pilot program expired in 2018, it was renewed and expanded by the New York City Council.

Glick was also the primary sponsor of bills allowing cities to set speed limits below 25 miles per hour, requiring motorists to yield to the right of way of pedestrians in crosswalks uncontrolled by traffic signals, and requiring those under 16 to use seat belts when riding in the backseat.

Parks and open space 

Glick has long fought against efforts to privatize open space in her district, and has been a strong proponent of maintaining and increasing park space in her district and in New York City. Glick was active in the fight against developing the Westside piers into Hudson River Park, and since the Park's creation has fought at the State and City level for adequate funding for the Park's maintenance and against efforts to privatize parts of the Park.

Glick has also been involved in grassroots community activism to preserve open space, including the preservation of the Elizabeth Street Garden. She was the lead sponsor on a bill that aided in the creation of the Stonewall National Monument, the first National Monument honoring the history of the LGBT rights movement.

Disability rights 

Glick was the lead sponsor of legislation requiring the MTA to make 100 key stations fully accessible. While the MTA has not completed this work, Glick has advocated for its completion and for expanding accessibility to additional stations.

Election Victories
On Tuesday September 14, 2016, Deborah Glick defeated Jim Fourratt in the Democratic Party Primary.  She won 3151 out of the 3928 votes cast.  Jim received 777 votes.

On Election Day in year 2014, Glick defeated two opponents in the general election.  The Assemblywoman won 16817 votes out of the 21089 votes cast.  Progressive Party candidate Alexander R. Meadows received 1545 votes and Republican Party nominee Nekeshia Woods received 2727 votes.

See also  
 LGBT culture in New York City
 LGBT rights in New York
 List of LGBT people from New York City

References

External links 
 Assembly profile
 Official campaign website
 Glick's response to the 2006 Candidate Questionnaire from the 504 Democratic Club of New York City
 Project VoteSmart's profile of Glick

1950 births
Living people
LGBT Jews
LGBT state legislators in New York (state)
American LGBT rights activists
Lesbian politicians
Jewish American state legislators in New York (state)
Democratic Party members of the New York State Assembly
Women state legislators in New York (state)
21st-century American politicians
21st-century American women politicians
20th-century American women politicians
20th-century American politicians
21st-century American Jews
21st-century LGBT people